Pedroveya is one of thirteen parishes (administrative divisions) in Quirós, a municipality within the province and autonomous community of the Principality of Asturias, in northern Spain.

The population is 30. (INE 2011)

Villages
 Pedroveya
 La Rebollá

Parishes in Quirós